Bourgade is a French-language surname meaning "small village whose houses are more scattered than in town". Notable people with the surname include:

François Bourgade (1806–1866), French missionary and philosopher
Peter Bourgade (1845–1908)

References 

French-language surnames